Atteridgeville is a township located to the west of Pretoria, South Africa. It is located to the east of Saulsville, to the west of West Park; to the north of Laudium and to the south of Lotus Gardens. The settlement was established in 1939, and is named after Mrs MP Atteridge, chairwoman of the Committee for Non-European Affairs on the Pretoria City Council at the time. The Lucas Masterpieces Moripe Stadium is located in Atteridgeville.

History

Early years
Atteridgeville was established by the government in 1939 as a settlement for black people, after much lobbying by Mrs Myrtle Patricia Atteridge, the chairwoman of the Committee for Non-European Affairs on the City Council at that time. Atteridgeville was established nine years prior to the election of the apartheid government in 1948. The first occupants were moved to Atteridgeville from Marabastad on 26 May 1940. It was officially opened on 5 August 1940. Mrs Atteridge, who was also a philanthropist, Black Sash activist and the deputy mayoress of Pretoria, endeavoured to improve living conditions of black people who were previously living in squalid conditions in Marabastad. Atteridgeville provided amenities such as brick housing, lighting and toilets, and later, so as to further enhance living standards, the township was connected by train to Pretoria CBD. Schools, creches and clinics were established thereafter. The naming of the township was in fact suggested by the black people themselves who also requested Mrs Atteridge to represent them in parliament which she refused as she was disinclined to participate in an exclusionary regime. Between 1940 and 1949, more than 1500 houses were built for people relocated from Marabastad, Bantule and other areas around Pretoria.

Apartheid era

Development was frozen between 1968 and 1978 in accordance with the government's policy that housing provided for black people be limited to the homelands. In 1984, Atteridgeville was granted municipal status.

1984 saw school boycotts and general unrest when demands by the Congress of South African Students to implement democratic students' representative councils in schools were rejected by the Department of Education and Training. The first victim of the school boycotts was Emma Sathekge from David Helen Peta High School. The schools were suspended for the better part of 1984 and exams were not written by all High school learners.

On 15 April 1988, a bomb explosion caused damage to the Atteridgeville Municipal buildings; no-one was injured during the attack. The attack was planned by Umkhonto we Sizwe and executed by one of their members, Johannes Maleka. In November 2000, Johannes Maleka was granted amnesty for his part in the attack by the Truth and Reconciliation Commission.

Demographics

Atteridgeville is a diverse township, the residents of which speak many languages. According to the 2011 census, the most commonly spoken language is Northern Sotho, Zulu , followed by Tswana and Sesotho. A mixture of languages such as Afrikaans, Setswana, English and Sesotho are sometimes fused together to form what is now a unique language style of the township with a slight inclination to slang known as Tsotsitaal or siPitori.

War memorial
The Mendi Memorial is a war memorial dedicated to over 600 black South African soldiers who died when the British vessel SS Mendi sank after a tragic collision in 1917, during the First World War. The memorial was unveiled on 24 March 1996. The memorial consists of the upper half of a soldier holding onto a ship's railing with the other hand extended towards the sky.

The memorial is located at the 'Ga-mothakga Resort 'on the corner of Pitse and Tlou Streets.

Notable people
 Sydney Maree (born 1956), a middle-distance athlete  
 Tutu Puoane (born 1979), jazz musician
 Sello Maake Ka-Ncube (born 1960), film and television actor
 Solly Msimanga, former mayor of Pretoria (2016–2019)
 Gwen Ramokgopa, politician and former mayor of Pretoria (2005–2010)
 Kgosientso Ramokgopa, Politician and former mayor of Pretoria (2012 -2016)
 Jeff Masemola, anti-apartheid activist, teacher, and founder of the armed wing of the Pan Africanist Congress (PAC)
 Dikgang Moseneke, former Robben Island prisoner, ex-vice-president of the PAC and retired deputy Chief Justice
 25K, rapper and songwriter
 Titus "Big Daddy" Lebese, Financial Markets Analyst on Motsweding FM, Business Advisory Specialist, Lebese Solutions Pty Ltd, Layminister in the Anglican Church of Southern Africa (ACSA), stationed at Bernard the Martyr Parish, Atteridgeville at 27 Ramushu Street.... STAR

See also
 SS Mendi
 Pretoria Sotho

References

Suburbs of Pretoria
Townships in Gauteng
Populated places established in 1939
1939 establishments in South Africa